Jagera is a genus of 4 species of forest trees known to science, constituting part of the plant family Sapindaceae.

They grow naturally in the rainforests and associated forests of eastern Australia, New Guinea and the Moluccas.

In Australia, Jagera pseudorhus is the most well known, and commonly named foambark, due to the saponins in the bark foaming after heavy rain. Indigenous Australians use this foam as the de-oxygenator of waterway pools for temporarily suffocating their fish enabling easy catching.

The genus is named after Herbert de Jager, a Dutch orientalist and associate of the botanist Georg Eberhard Rumphius.

In the last few decades various new names have been formally published, numbers of them subsequently corrected to synonyms of earlier names and a few remaining recognised as genuine new species or varieties.

One recognised species in Malesia apparently remains still to be formally described.

Species
 Jagera javanica  – New Guinea, Moluccas (Indonesia)
synonyms: J. serrata , J. speciosa , J. macrophylla 
 Jagera madida , Daintree foambark  – NE. Qld endemic/>
synonyms: J. javanica subsp. australiana , misapplication: J. serrata ,
 Jagera pseudorhus , Foambark, ferntree, pink foambark, ferntop, pink tamarind – NSW, Qld, Australia, New Guinea
 var. integerrima  – Atherton Tableland, Qld, Australia endemic
 var. pseudorhus – NSW, Qld, Australia, New Guinea

Formerly included here
 Jagera dasyantha  and J. discolor    ⇒  Cnesmocarpon dasyantha  – New Guinea, Australia

See also
 Cnesmocarpon

References

Cited works

External links

 Photograph of Jagera pseudorhus leaves NSW PlantNet.

Sapindaceae
Sapindaceae genera